Gamrekeli is a Georgian surname. Notable people with the surname include:

 Gamrekeli, also known as Toreli, a medieval Georgian noble family
 David Gamrekeli (1911–1977), Georgian baritone opera singer
 Irakli Gamrekeli (1894–1943), Georgian set designer

Georgian-language surnames